Leny de Andrade Lima, known professionally as Leny Andrade, was born in Rio de Janeiro, on January 26, 1943, and is a Brazilian singer and musician. Both Andrade's first and last names are sometimes misspelled in English as "Lenn", "Leni", and "Adrade". She has had several hits on the Brazilian charts. In 2007 she shared a Latin Grammy Award with Cesar Camargo Mariano for Best MPB (Musica Popular Brasileira) Album, Ao Vivo.

She began her career singing in clubs, lived five years in Mexico, and spent a good part of her life living in the United States and Europe. She studied piano at the Brazilian Conservatory of Music.

She has performed with Paquito D'Rivera, Luiz Eça, Dick Farney, João Donato, Eumir Deodato, Pery Ribeiro, and Francis Hime. Andrade's style is a synthesis of samba and jazz.

Reception
She has been described by Tony Bennett as the "Ella Fitzgerald of Brazil" and others have compared her to the late Sarah Vaughan. In Europe where she toured, she was the Brazilian First Lady of Jazz, building a huge fan base in the Netherlands and Italy. She recorded the album Embraceable You in July 1991 at Volendam, the Netherlands.

Stephen Holden of The New York Times wrote of Andrade's performance at Birdland on August 27, 2008, "To describe Ms. Andrade as both the Sarah Vaughan and Ella Fitzgerald of bossa nova only goes so far in evoking a performer whose voice seems to contain the body and soul of Brazil. You may think you know "The Girl from Ipanema", the final number in the show's opening medley of Jobim songs. But you haven't really absorbed it until you've heard Ms. Andrade sing it in Portuguese; disgorge might be a better word than sing, since, like everything else she performs, it seems to well up from the center of the earth."

Discography
 A Sensacao (RCA, 1961)
 A Arte Maior de Leny Andrade (Polydor, 1963)
 Gemini V with Pery Ribeiro (Odeon, 1965)
 Estamos Ai (Odeon, 1965)
 Gemini V en Mexico with Pery Ribeiro (Odeon, 1966)
 Leny Andrade (RVV, 1968)
 Gemini Cinco Anos Depois with Pery Ribeiro (Odeon, 1972)
 Alvoroco (Odeon, 1973)
 Leny Andrade (Odeon, 1975)
 Registro (CBS, 1979)
 Leny Andrade (Pointer, 1984)
 Cartola 80 Anos (Pan Producoes Artisticas, 1987)
 Luz Neon (Eldorado, 1989)
 Eu Quero Ver (Eldorado, 1990)
 Bossa Nova (Eldorado, 1991)
 Embraceable You (Timeless, 1991)
 Nos with Cesar Camargo Mariano (Velas, 1993)
 Maiden Voyage with Fred Hersch (Chesky, 1994)
 Coisa Fina with Romero Lubambo (Perfil Musical, 1994)
 Letra & Musica: Antonio Carlos Jobim with Cristovao Bastos (Lumiar Discos, 1995)
 Luz Negra: Nelson Cavaquinho por Leny Andrade (Velas, 1995)
 Bossas Novas (Albatroz, 1998)
 Seja Voce (Albatroz, 2001)
 Canta Altay Veloso (Obi Music, 2002)
 Lua Do Arpoador with Romero Lubambo (Biscoito Fino, 2006)
 Ao Vivo (Albatroz, 2012)
 As Cancoes Do Rei (Albatroz, 2013)
 Iluminados – Leny Andrade sings Ivan Lins & Vítor Martins (2014)
 Alegria De Viver with Roni Ben-Hur (Motema, 2014)
 Canta Fred Falcao: Bossa Nova (Biscoito Fino, 2018)
 Alma Mia (Fina Flor, 2019)

References

External links
 Leny Andrade  in Dicionário Cravo Albin da Música Popula Brasileira

Leny Andrade at Slipcue.com's guide to Brazilian music
Leny Andrade NM Music Agency Artist Profile of Leny Andrade

1943 births
Living people
Bossa nova singers
20th-century Brazilian women singers
20th-century Brazilian singers
Brazilian jazz composers
Brazilian jazz singers
Chesky Records artists
Latin Grammy Award winners
Música Popular Brasileira singers
Musicians from Rio de Janeiro (city)
21st-century Brazilian women singers
21st-century Brazilian singers
Motéma Music artists
Timeless Records artists
Polydor Records artists
CBS Records artists